Morgan Brittany (born Suzanne Cupito) is an American actress. She is best-known for her role as Katherine Wentworth, the scheming younger half-sister of Pamela Ewing and Cliff Barnes, on the prime-time soap opera Dallas.

Career

Early child career
Los Angeles-born Suzanne Cupito began her acting career as a child under her real name.  She appeared on many programs in the 1950s and 1960s, beginning at age five in a 1957 episode of the CBS television network anthology series Playhouse 90 (or at that same age in an episode of Sea Hunt). In January 1960, she displayed her talent as a ballet dancer on The Dinah Shore Chevy Show. Three months later, she followed that up with her first of three Twilight Zone episodes, uncredited as a little girl in "Nightmare as a Child". She also portrayed Sissy Johnson in the season four episode "Valley of the Shadow" and the vicious brat Susan in the season five episode "Caesar and Me".  

She was featured in the musical film Gypsy (1962), as Baby June. She appeared in the episode "Daughter for a Day" on ABC's My Three Sons (1962) as Jeannie Hill. She appeared in the episode "Daddy Went Away" on CBS's Gunsmoke (May 11, 1963) as Jessica Damon. She appeared uncredited in the birthday party and school house scenes in Alfred Hitchcock's The Birds (1963). 

In 1963, she played "Winter Night" in the episode "Incident of the Hostages" of Rawhide. In 1964, she starred as a blind girl named Minerva Gordon in a two-part episode of The Outer Limits, "The Inheritors",  appeared in the Western film Stage to Thunder Rock. 

In 1966, she appeared in the series finale of the Western Branded, playing an orphan named "Kellie" in the episode of the same name. She was part of the ensemble cast in the film Yours, Mine and Ours (1968), which is led by Lucille Ball and Henry Fonda. She also appeared in the season eight premiere episode of The Andy Griffith Show titled "Opie's First Love" as Mary Alice.

She appeared in two episodes of Lassie, "Lassie and the Swamp Girl" and "Little Dog Lost" as "Mattie" in the mid-1960s. She followed that up with appearances on Gunsmoke and other shows. At the age of 15, after appearing in Yours, Mine and Ours (1968), her childhood career came to an end and she concentrated on getting her education at Cleveland High School, Reseda, California.

Adult career
At age 18, Cupito changed her name to Morgan Brittany and then appeared with Gene Kelly in his Las Vegas show, Gene Kelly's Wonderful World of Girls, as a dancer. She then moved to New York City, where she modeled for the Ford Modeling Agency, and appeared in several TV commercials and print ads (including a three-year stint as "The Ultra Brite Toothpaste Girl"), and was spokesmodel for brands such as L'Oreal, Maybelline, Ford, Levi's and Camay. In December 1972, she played Cynthia, a childhood friend of Bridget's (Meredith Baxter), in episode 12, "The Homecoming" on Bridget Loves Bernie. In 1974, she was hired by the Japanese cosmetics company Kanebo to be the "face" of their product "Ireine", and so moved to Tokyo from 1974 to 1976 and traveled around the world as the image of "Kanebo Cosmetics".

Brittany portrayed actress Vivien Leigh in Gable and Lombard (1976) a biography of Clark Gable and Carole Lombard. She also had a cameo appearance in the John Schlesinger film The Day of the Locust (1975) as Leigh in the climax of the film. That was followed by TV movies and series, such as The Amazing Howard Hughes (1977), The Initiation of Sarah (1978), Death Car on the Freeway (1979), The Dream Merchants (1980), and LBJ: The Early Years (1987). In 1980, while filming an episode of The Dukes of Hazzard, Brittany met her future husband, stuntman Jack Gill.

She appeared again as Vivien Leigh in the climax of the made-for-TV movie about the search for an actress to star in Gone with the Wind's film adaptation, The Scarlett O'Hara War (1980), which marked the second of her three portrayals of the British actress. 

This caught the attention of the producers of Dallas, who were searching for an actress to play Katherine Wentworth, the scheming half-sister of Pamela Ewing and Cliff Barnes. She debuted on Dallas in the 1981–82 season and her role as Katherine continued, on and off, until 1987. In 1985, she returned for a cameo in that season's finale where her character killed Bobby Ewing by running him over with a car, killing herself in the process. She made a brief, final appearance on the series in 1987. 

In 1984, she co-starred in the short-lived ABC drama series, Glitter, as Kate Simpson, a reporter for an entertainment magazine. This was one of several collaborations with producer Aaron Spelling throughout her career. Her first show with him had been an appearance in Burke's Law, in 1964 when Brittany was a child. Later, as an adult, she appeared in seven episodes of The Love Boat, Hotel, Fantasy Island, Melrose Place, and the 1990s revival of Burke's Law. She appeared in The Wild Women of Chastity Gulch (1982).  

She co-hosted the syndicated sports show Star Games. and later hosted more than 100 episodes of the magazine show Photoplay, produced by Jack Haley Jr. 

She guest starred on such other series as Married... with Children, Murder, She Wrote, The Perry Mason Mysteries, Dear John, Sabrina the Teenage Witch and The Nanny. In film, Brittany starred in Sundown: The Vampire in Retreat (1989).

Recent years
In the 1990s, Brittany appeared in independent films, including Riders in the Storm (1995), Legend of the Spirit Dog (1997), The Protector (1997), The Biggest Fan (2002), Mothers and Daughters (2006) and Americanizing Shelley (2007). She also appeared in the docudrama, 1 a Minute (2010).

Personal life
As of 2014, Brittany is a conservative political commentator and author. She writes a weekly column for WorldNetDaily.

Her first book, with co-authors Ann-Marie Murrell and Dr. Gina Loudon, What Women Really Want, was released September 2, 2014. She is a recurring guest on Hannity (FOX News), and The Rick Amato Show (One America) and has appeared on The Kudlow Report (CNBC), Fox & Friends, The Dennis Miller Show and Huckabee. 

She is a co-owner and anchor for PolitiChicks, an online news site with a conservative perspective. Her second book, with co-author Ann-Marie Murrell, was released in 2017. PolitiChicks: A Clarion Call to Political Activism is a compilation book of essays from "PolitiChicks" writers. Brittany now travels the country speaking at major venues like The Heritage Foundation and other conservative organizations.

Brittany married stuntman Jack Gill in 1981. They are the parents of actress Katie Gill and musician/stuntman Cody Gill.

References

External links

 
 
 

20th-century American actresses
21st-century American actresses
Actresses from Los Angeles
American child actresses
American film actresses
American soap opera actresses
American television actresses
California Republicans
Living people
Year of birth missing (living people)